Silk Husbands and Calico Wives is a 1920 American silent drama film directed by Alfred E. Green and starring House Peters. The film was produced by Harry Garson and based on an original by Monte Katterjohn.

The film is preserved at the Library of Congress.

Plot
As described in a film magazine, Deane Kendall (Peters), a country boy who has succeeded in being admitted to the bar, finds few clients in the small village of Harmony. When there is a sensational case involving a man being tried for the murder of his wife's lover, Edith Beecher (Alden), court stenographer and Deane's sweetheart, manages to arrange for Deane to defend the husband. Deane's masterful defense frees the man and Deane wins a position with a city law firm. Deane marries Edith and they move to the city. Deane makes rapid progress but Edith remains a "home body." Society girl Georgia Wilson (Novak) determines to break up this family so she can have Deane for herself. She is aided in her plans by an architect who loves Edith. Through a trick, Edith is lured to the architect's apartment. Edith believes that Deane, with his strict views concerning a wife's conduct, will divorce Edith. However, a madly jealous discarded sweetheart of the architect informs Deane of the whole plot. Edith, thinking she has made her husband unhappy and fearing his wrath concerning her visit to the architect, has fled the city to return to her village home. Deane follows her and a reconciliation takes place.

Cast
House Peters as Deane Kendall
Mary Alden as Edith Beecher Kendall
Mildred Reardon as Marcia Lawson
Edward Kimball as Jerome Appleby
Sam Sothern as Alec Beecher
Eva Novak as Georgia Wilson
Vincent Serrano as Charles Madison
Rosita Marstini as Mrs. Westervelt (billed as Madame Marstini)

References

External links

 Lobby posters media

1920 films
American silent feature films
Films directed by Alfred E. Green
Films based on short fiction
1920 drama films
Silent American drama films
American black-and-white films
1920s American films